Last Call is a 2012 American independent comedy film and the directorial debut of Greg Garthe. The film stars Travis Van Winkle and Ryan Hansen. Filming began in Los Angeles in August 2009.

Plot
Two underachieving cousins, Danny (Van Winkle) and Phil (Hansen) have to prove themselves when they are charged with managing the family pub, in a bid to save their wayward uncle from prison and financial ruin.

Cast
 Travis Van Winkle as Danny
 Ryan Hansen as Phil
 Tara Reid as Lindsay
 Diora Baird as Janine
 Clint Howard as George
 David DeLuise as Mike
 Richard Riehle as Harold
 Tom Arnold as Gabe
 Dave Foley as Mr. Nunley
 Christopher Lloyd as Pete
 Phil Hendrie as Mulvahill
 Cutter Garcia as Joe
 Carrot Top as Mailman

Production
Filming began in Los Angeles in August 2009.

Release
The film was scheduled to be screened at the 16th annual Sonoma International Film Festival in April 2012.

References

External links
 
 

2012 films
American independent films
American comedy films
2012 comedy films
Films shot in Los Angeles
2012 independent films
2010s English-language films
2010s American films